James Gray Stuart, 1st Viscount Stuart of Findhorn,  (9 February 1897 – 20 February 1971) was a British Unionist politician. He was joint-Parliamentary Secretary to the Treasury in Winston Churchill's war-time coalition government and later served as Secretary of State for Scotland under Churchill and then Sir Anthony Eden from 1951 to 1957. In 1959 he was elevated to the peerage as Viscount Stuart of Findhorn.

Background
Born in Edinburgh, Stuart was the third and youngest son of Morton Stuart, 17th Earl of Moray, and Edith Douglas Palmer, daughter of Rear-Admiral George Palmer.

Military service
Stuart was commissioned from the Officers Training Corps into the Royal Scots (Special Reserve) as a 2nd Lieutenant (his probation completed in Jan 1915) and served in the First World War, reaching the rank of Captain. He was awarded the Military Cross and Bar in 1917.

He was appointed Equerry to HRH Prince Albert in June 1920, and was appointed a Member (4th Class) of the Royal Victorian Order in the 1922 New Year Honours, with the award dated 3 Dec 1921.

Political career
Stuart sat as Member of Parliament (MP) for Moray and Nairn from 1923 to 1959. He served as a Lord of the Treasury from 1935 to 1941 under successively Ramsay MacDonald, Stanley Baldwin, Neville Chamberlain and Winston Churchill and was sworn of the Privy Council in the 1939 Birthday Honours. In 1941 Churchill promoted him to joint Parliamentary Secretary to the Treasury (Government Chief Whip), which he remained until 1945. He continued as Conservative Chief Whip until 1948. In 1950 he became Chairman of the Scottish Unionist Party, a post he held until 1962.

When the Conservatives returned to power under Churchill in 1951, Stuart was made Secretary of State for Scotland, with a seat in the cabinet. He continued in this post until 1957, the last two years under the premiership of Sir Anthony Eden. He was appointed a Companion of Honour in 1957. On 20 November 1959 he was elevated to the peerage as Viscount Stuart of Findhorn, of Findhorn in the County of Moray.

Family

Lord Stuart of Findhorn married Lady Rachel Cavendish, daughter of Victor Cavendish, 9th Duke of Devonshire (and sister of Dorothy Cavendish, wife of Harold Macmillan), in 1923.

He had earlier been noted as a suitor of Lady Elizabeth Bowes-Lyon while serving as  an equerry to her eventual husband Prince Albert, Duke of York (the future King George VI).

Lord and Lady Stuart had two sons and one daughter. 
 David, 2nd Viscount Stuart of Findhorn (1924-1999)
 John, a Royal Navy lieutenant (1925-1990)
 Jean (Mrs Michael Ritchie) born 7 January 1932.

Lord Stuart died in February 1971, aged 74, and was succeeded in the viscountcy by his eldest son, David. Lady Stuart of Findhorn died in October 1977.

Arms

References

Sources
 Torrance, David, The Scottish Secretaries (Birlinn 2006)
 Stuart, James; Viscount Stuart of Findhorn. Within the Fringe: An Autobiography

External links

1897 births
1971 deaths
British Army personnel of World War I
British Militia officers
British Secretaries of State
Members of the Order of the Companions of Honour
Members of the Parliament of the United Kingdom for Highland constituencies
Members of the Privy Council of the United Kingdom
Members of the Royal Victorian Order
Ministers in the Churchill wartime government, 1940–1945
Politics of Moray
Recipients of the Military Cross
Royal Scots officers
UK MPs 1923–1924
UK MPs 1924–1929
UK MPs 1929–1931
UK MPs 1931–1935
UK MPs 1935–1945
UK MPs 1945–1950
UK MPs 1950–1951
UK MPs 1951–1955
UK MPs 1955–1959
UK MPs who were granted peerages
Unionist Party (Scotland) MPs
Younger sons of earls
Ministers in the Churchill caretaker government, 1945
Ministers in the Chamberlain wartime government, 1939–1940
Viscounts created by Elizabeth II
Ministers in the Chamberlain peacetime government, 1937–1939
Ministers in the third Churchill government, 1951–1955
Ministers in the Eden government, 1955–1957